The Heptapteridae, or three-barbeled catfishes, are a family of catfish that originate from the Americas. Most species are restricted to South America, but Imparfinis lineatus, Nemuroglanis panamensis and Pimelodella chagresi are native to Panama, and Rhamdia species occur as far north as Mexico. The name Heptapteridae is derived from Greek, hepta meaning seven and pteron meaning fin.

The diversity of this family is poorly known, and many species are yet to be described. So far, some 211 species have been described. This family is equivalent to the previously recognized Rhamdiinae, a subfamily of the family Pimelodidae. However, molecular evidence shows this family is a part of the superfamily Pimelodoidea along with the Pimelodidae, Pseudopimelodidae, and Conorhynchos.

The skin of these fish is usually naked (scaleless). They exhibit three pairs of barbels. They have a large adipose fin, and their caudal fin is deeply forked. However, no external characteristics unique to this family allow it to be differentiated from  the  Pimelodidae.

The Heptapteridae include a few troglobitic species in the genera Pimelodella, Rhamdia, Rhamdiopsis, and Taunayia.

References

 
Catfish families
Taxa named by Theodore Gill